The Muddy Waters Woodstock Album is an album by blues musician Muddy Waters released by the Chess label in 1975. The album features Levon Helm and Garth Hudson from The Band and Paul Butterfield.

Reception

The album won the Grammy Award for Best Ethnic or Traditional Folk Recording at the 18th Annual Grammy Awards in 1976.

In a retrospective assessment, AllMusic reviewer Bruce Eder stated "this album worked best because they let Waters be himself, producing music that compared favorably to his concerts of the period, which were wonderful. His final album for Chess (recorded at Levon Helm's Woodstock studio, not in Chicago), with Helm and fellow Band-member Garth Hudson teaming up with Waters' touring band, it was a rocking (in the bluesy sense) soulful swansong to the label where he got his start. Waters covers some songs he knew back when, plays some slide, and generally has a great time on this Grammy-winning album".

Track listing 
All compositions by McKinley Morganfield  except where noted
 "Why Are People Like That" (Bobby Charles) – 3:35
 "Going Down to Main Street" – 3:57
 "Born with Nothing" – 5:20
 "Caledonia" (Fleecie Moore) – 6:14
 "Funny Sounds" – 4:32
 "Love, Deep as the Ocean" – 5:10
 "Let the Good Times Roll" (Fleecie Moore, Sam Theard) – 5:13
 "Kansas City" (Jerry Leiber, Mike Stoller) – 5:09
 "Fox Squirrel" – 3:56 [Bonus track on CD reissues]

Personnel 
Muddy Waters – vocals, guitar
Garth Hudson – organ, accordion, saxophone
Paul Butterfield – harmonica
Bob Margolin – guitar
Pinetop Perkins – piano
Howard Johnson – saxophone
Fred Carter Jr. – bass, guitar
Levon Helm – drums, bass

References 

1975 albums
Muddy Waters albums
Chess Records albums
Grammy Award for Best Ethnic or Traditional Folk Recording